In mathematics, the Mittag-Leffler polynomials are the polynomials gn(x) or Mn(x) studied by . 

Mn(x) is a special case of the Meixner polynomial Mn(x;b,c)  at b = 0, c = -1.

Definition and examples

Generating functions 
The Mittag-Leffler polynomials are defined respectively by the generating functions
 and

They also have the bivariate generating function

Examples
The first few polynomials are given in the following table.
{| class="wikitable"
!n !! gn(x) !! Mn(x)
|-
| 0 ||   || 
|-
| 1 ||  || 
|-
| 2 ||  || 
|-
| 3 ||  || 
|-
| 4 ||  || 
|-
| 5 ||  || 
|-
| 6 ||   || 
|-
| 7 ||  || 
|-
| 8 ||  || 
|-
| 9 ||  || 
|-
| 10 ||  || 
|}

Properties
Also .

Explicit formulas
Explicit formulas are
  
  
 
(the last one immediately shows , a kind of reflection formula), and
, which can be also written as
, where  denotes the falling factorial.
In terms of the Gaussian hypergeometric function, we have

Reflection formula

Recursion formulas
The polynomials  can be defined recursively by 
Another recursion formula, which produces an odd one from the preceding even ones and vice versa, is  
 
 

Concerning recursion formula (3), the polynomial  is the unique polynomial solution of the difference equation , normalized so that .

Initial values 
It also illustrates the reflection formula  with respect to the main diagonal, e.g. .
{| class="wikitable"
! !! 1!! 2 !! 3 !! 4 !! 5 !! 6 !! 7 !! 8 !! 9 !! 10
|-
! 1 
| style="text-align: right;" |1 || style="text-align: right;" |1 || style="text-align: right;" |1 || style="text-align: right;" |1 || style="text-align: right;" |1 || style="text-align: right;" |1 || style="text-align: right;" |1 || style="text-align: right;" |1 || style="text-align: right;" |1 || style="text-align: right;" |1
|-
 ! 2 
| style="text-align: right;" |2 || style="text-align: right;" |4 || style="text-align: right;" |6 || style="text-align: right;" |8 || style="text-align: right;" |10 || style="text-align: right;" |12 || style="text-align: right;" |14 || style="text-align: right;" |16 || style="text-align: right;" |18 || style="text-align: right;" |
|-
 ! 3 
| style="text-align: right;" |3 || style="text-align: right;" |9 || style="text-align: right;" |19 || style="text-align: right;" |33 || style="text-align: right;" |51 || style="text-align: right;" |73 || style="text-align: right;" |99 || style="text-align: right;" |129 || style="text-align: right;" | || style="text-align: right;" |
|-
 ! 4 
| style="text-align: right;" |4 || style="text-align: right;" |16 || style="text-align: right;" |44 || style="text-align: right;" |96 || style="text-align: right;" |180 || style="text-align: right;" |304 || style="text-align: right;" |476 || style="text-align: right;" | || style="text-align: right;" | || style="text-align: right;" |
|-
 ! 5 
| style="text-align: right;" |5 || style="text-align: right;" |25 || style="text-align: right;" |85 || style="text-align: right;" |225 || style="text-align: right;" |501 || style="text-align: right;" |985 || style="text-align: right;" | || style="text-align: right;" | || style="text-align: right;" | || style="text-align: right;" |
|-
 ! 6 
| style="text-align: right;" |6 || style="text-align: right;" |36 || style="text-align: right;" |146 || style="text-align: right;" |456 || style="text-align: right;" |1182 || style="text-align: right;" | || style="text-align: right;" | || style="text-align: right;" | || style="text-align: right;" | || style="text-align: right;" |
|-
 ! 7 
| style="text-align: right;" |7 || style="text-align: right;" |49 || style="text-align: right;" |231 || style="text-align: right;" |833 || style="text-align: right;" | || style="text-align: right;" | || style="text-align: right;" | || style="text-align: right;" | || style="text-align: right;" | || style="text-align: right;" |
|-
 ! 8 
| style="text-align: right;" |8 || style="text-align: right;" |64 || style="text-align: right;" |344 || style="text-align: right;" | || style="text-align: right;" | || style="text-align: right;" | || style="text-align: right;" | || style="text-align: right;" | || style="text-align: right;" | || style="text-align: right;" |
|-
 ! 9 
| style="text-align: right;" |9 || style="text-align: right;" |81 || style="text-align: right;" | || style="text-align: right;" | || style="text-align: right;" | || style="text-align: right;" | || style="text-align: right;" | || style="text-align: right;" | || style="text-align: right;" | || style="text-align: right;" |
|-
 ! 10 
| style="text-align: right;" | 10 || style="text-align: right;" | || style="text-align: right;" | || style="text-align: right;" | || style="text-align: right;" | || style="text-align: right;" | || style="text-align: right;" | || style="text-align: right;" | || style="text-align: right;" | ||
|-
 |}

Orthogonality relations
For  the following orthogonality relation holds:

(Note that this is not a complex integral. As each  is an even or an odd polynomial, the imaginary arguments just produce alternating signs for their coefficients. Moreover, if  and  have different parity, the integral vanishes trivially.)

Binomial identity 
Being a Sheffer sequence of binomial type, the Mittag-Leffler polynomials  also satisfy the binomial identity 
.

Integral representations 
Based on the representation as a hypergeometric function, there are several ways of representing  for  directly as integrals, some of them being even valid for complex , e.g. 

  

  

  

 

.

Closed forms of integral families
There are several families of integrals with closed-form expressions in terms of  zeta values where the coefficients of the Mittag-Leffler polynomials occur as coefficients. One way to work out those integrals is to obtain for them the corresponding recursion formulas as for the Mittag-Leffler polynomials using integration by parts.  

1. For instance, define for  
 
These integrals have the closed form
  
E.g. from 
  we get 

2. Likewise take for 
 

In umbral notation, where after expanding,  has to be replaced by the Dirichlet eta function , those have the closed form
.

3.

 

 
 
4. For , define .  

 
Note that only odd zeta values (odd ) occur here (unless the denominators are cast as even zeta values), e.g. 

  

5. If  is odd, the same integral is much more involved to evaluate, including the initial one . Yet it turns out that the pattern subsists if we define , equivalently . Then  has the following closed form in umbral notation, replacing  by :
, e.g.

6. But the difference of two such integrals with corresponding degree differences is well-defined and exhibits very similar patterns, e.g. 
.

See also
 Bernoulli polynomials of the second kind
 Stirling polynomials
 Poly-Bernoulli number

References

 

Polynomials